Alburnoides eichwaldii, also known as the South Caspian sprilin or Kura chub, is a fish species in the family Cyprinidae. It is widespread in the Western Asia in the river drainages of the southwestern Caspian coast from Samur down to rivers of the Lenkoran Province in Azerbaijan. It prefers streams and rivers in the foothills, with well oxygenated, fast-flowing waters, and spawns on gravel in swift currents.

References 

 

eichwaldii
Fish described in 1863
Cyprinid fish of Asia
Freshwater fish of Western Asia
Fauna of Azerbaijan